TV Globo (formerly Rede Globo) is the main producer of telenovelas in Brazil. Its productions are split into five different categories, according to the airtime. Novelas airing at 9:00 p.m. (known as "novela das nove"), or 8:00 p.m ("novela das oito") telenovela, but these programs are never broadcast at 8:00 p.m, the earliest known time that a novela of this period has aired was 8:30 p.m.) feature plots that tend to be more formulaic, although a wider range of themes are explored. These productions include elements of action, romance and humour and usually last longer than the other novelas. These productions usually garner the highest ratings. These categories became widely adopted by most television companies in Brazil.

Telenovelas
 Gold indicates the #1 most watched telenovela of all time.
 Silver indicates the #2 most watched telenovela of all time.
 Yellow indicates the top 10 most watched telenovelas.
 Red indicates the least watched telenovela of all time.

1960s

1970s

1980s

1990s

2000s

2010s

2020s

Notes

References

TV Globo telenovelas
Rede Globo 08
Brazil culture-related lists
Brazilian television-related lists